Nottingham is an unincorporated community in Baltimore County, Maryland, United States. Its elevation is 62 feet (19 m). Although Nottingham is unincorporated, it has a post office, with the ZIP code of 21236. Nottingham is often considered a broad area in Baltimore County, encompassing many census-designated places (CDPs) and unincorporated communities. There is also a historical town in Prince George's County that was named Nottingham - it is now an archeological site.

Its total population at the time of the 2000 U.S. Census was 37,779.

References

Unincorporated communities in Baltimore County, Maryland
Unincorporated communities in Maryland